The 40th Arizona State Legislature, consisting of the Arizona State Senate and the Arizona House of Representatives, was constituted in Phoenix from January 1, 1991, to December 31, 1992, during the first two years of  Fife Symington's first term as governor. Both the Senate and the House membership remained constant at 30 and 60, respectively. The Democrats flipped control in the Senate, gaining four seats and creating a Democratic majority of 17–13. The Democrats also gained two seats in the house, decreasing the Republican majority to 33–27.

Sessions
The Legislature met for two regular sessions at the State Capitol in Phoenix. The first opened on January 14, 1991, and adjourned on June 22, while the Second Regular Session convened on January 13, 1992, and adjourned sine die on July 1.

There were nine Special Sessions, the first of which was convened on January 31, 1991, and adjourned on February 2; the second convened on September 17, 1991, and adjourned sine die later that same day; the third convened on November 1, 1991, and adjourned sine die on November 7; the fourth convened on December 2, 1991, and adjourned sine die on December 16; and the fifth convened on February 17, 1992, and adjourned sine die February 22; the sixth convened on February 17, 1992, and adjourned sine die on May 7; the seventh convened on March 17, 1992, and adjourned sine die on March 31; the eighth convened on April 8, 1992, and adjourned sine die on June 27; and the ninth and final special session convened on May 4, 1992, and adjourned sine die on July 1.

State Senate

Members

The asterisk (*) denotes members of the previous Legislature who continued in office as members of this Legislature.

House of Representatives

Members 
The asterisk (*) denotes members of the previous Legislature who continued in office as members of this Legislature.

References

Arizona legislative sessions
1991 in Arizona
1992 in Arizona
1991 U.S. legislative sessions
1992 U.S. legislative sessions